Plurk is a free social networking and micro-blogging service that allows users to send updates (otherwise known as plurks) through short messages or links, which can be up to 360 text characters in length (as of 2016).

Updates are then shown on the user's home page using a timeline, which lists all the updates received in chronological order, and delivered to other users who have chosen to receive them. A unique feature of its timeline is horizontal scrolling which is unlike any other popular social networking or micro-blogging websites like Twitter or Facebook, where users can see more posts running horizontally across the screen, with previous plurks to the right. Each of the threads shows timestamps below the timeline frame, and a counter for the number of responses; a thread can have as many as 300 to a thousand responses. Users can respond to other users' updates from their timeline through the Plurk.com website, by private or instant messaging, or by text messaging via compatible third party applications.

History
After months of development, Plurk was launched on May 12, 2008.

The etymology of the name was explained by the developers as such:
 abbreviation of 'people' and 'lurk'
 portmanteau of 'play' and 'work'
 acronym of peace, love, unity, respect, and karma
 verb neologism, similar to how Google was eventually used as a verb

While it is difficult to track down the names of the creators of Plurk, and the "A-Team" link listed under "creator" leads to a page that lacks any real information, it is known that the current CEO is Alvin Woon. In January 2013, it was announced that the company has been headquartered in Taipei, Taiwan, while it has landed [an] undisclosed amount of funding."

Features and technology
Plurk's interface shows updates in horizontal form through a scrollable timeline written in JavaScript and updated through AJAX. Users can modify the interface using CSS and HTML scripts as well. Users can post new messages with optional 'qualifiers', which are one-word verbs used to represent a thought (e.g., 'feels', 'thinks', 'loves', etc.). There are also advanced features such as sending updates only to a subset of your friends, posting updates on events earlier in the day, and sharing images, videos, and other media. Followers are allowed, but only limited to accounts that are not set as private. Users can upload media files through YouTube, links and webcam or from their computer. Plurks can also be 'liked', as in other social sites. In addition, it has a birthday reminder feature that places a birthday cake sign on all the user's messages on his/her birthday. Every plurker has his/her own Karma value. It is recalculated based on your activities. Higher Karma can access to more emoticons.

Plurk also supports group conversations between friends and allows usage of emoticons together with the usual text micro-blogging. Plurk also supports the upload of users' own pictures as emoticons.

The Plurk.com developers allowed public access to the API on December 4, 2009.

Due to messages being sent between users in near-realtime, many users use Plurk as an alternative to chat and interact with each other.

Availability in other languages
To help translate their base list of qualifiers/verbs, Plurk hosts its own translation website where users can submit translations of the Plurk user interface in other languages. As of July 2008, Plurk is translated into over twenty languages.

Reception
Plurk was occasionally referred to as a rival to Twitter, an earlier micro-blogging service, during its first year.

In June 2008, Plurk received online attention when it was featured by Leo Laporte and Amber MacArthur on their net@night show in the TWiT.tv podcast network.

Controversies

MSN Juku controversy

In November 2009, MSN China launched an Internet application called MSN Juku in beta.  Observers noted similarity between the MSN Juku user interface and that of  Plurk, which was blocked in China in April 2009. Microsoft later indefinitely suspended MSN Juku, admitting to accusations that MSN China plagiarized about 80% of Plurk's original code, as well as elements of their CSS and unique user interface features.

Post calling for the assassination of President Ma Ying-jeou
On March 20, 2010, Taiwanese police investigated an Internet threat posted on plurk.com that called for the assassination of the President of the Republic of China, Ma Ying-jeou.

References

External links

Taiwanese social networking websites
Blog hosting services